Diary of Korean-Japanese War is a 1978 South Korean war drama film directed by Jang Il-ho. It was chosen as Best Film at the Grand Bell Awards.

Synopsis 
Based on Admiral Yi Sun-sin's war diary, Nanjung ilgi, the film portrays Yi's life during the Imjin War (1592-1598).

Cast 
 Kim Jin-kyu
 Jang Dong-he
 Hwang Hae
 Jeong Ae-ran
 Tae Hyun-sil
 Na Ki-su
 Kim Jin
 Park Jun-ho
 Hah Myung-joong
 Kim Seong-ae

References

Notes

Bibliography

External links 
 
 

1978 films
1970s biographical drama films
South Korean war drama films
Films set in the 1590s
Films set in the Joseon dynasty
Best Picture Grand Bell Award winners
1970s Korean-language films
South Korean biographical drama films
1978 drama films